Bassam Kousa (born 7 November 1954 in Aleppo) is a Syrian film and TV actor. He played many important roles in popular TV series including Bab al-Hara and Old Times. He is also an accomplished film actor.

Personal life
Kousa is married to Thawra Alyoussef and has two children.

Filmography
 Al-Kompars (1993)
 Turab al-Ghurabaa (1998)
 Nassim al-Roh (1998)
 The Box of Life (2002)
 Solitaire (2016)

References

1954 births
Living people
Syrian male film actors
Syrian male television actors
People from Aleppo